Norm or Norman Jacobsen may refer to:

 Norman Jacobsen (cricketer) (1889–1950), New Zealand cricketer and political candidate
 Norman Jacobsen (politician) (1930–2019), Canadian logger and politician

See also
 Norm Jacobson